Dracophyllum latifolium, commonly called needle-leaved neinei or spider wood, is a species of plant in the family Ericaceae that is endemic to New Zealand.

References

latifolium
Flora of the North Island
Endemic flora of New Zealand